A superstar is a widely acclaimed celebrity.

Superstar or superstars may also refer to:

People
 Warhol superstars, the associates of Andy Warhol
 WWE Superstar, a branding term referring to a WWE wrestler
 Superstar Billy Graham (born 1943), used the name Superstar
 Princess Superstar (aka Concetta Kirschner, born 1971), Italian-American rapper
 Har Mar Superstar (born 1978), musician from Minnesota
 Roni Duani (born 1986), Israeli singer also known as Roni Superstar
 Rajinikanth (born 1950), Indian film actor often credited as Superstar Rajinikanth
 Shakib Khan (born 1979), Bangladeshi actor popularly referred as Superstar Shakib Khan
Steve Austin (born 1964), used the name Superstar during his short time in Extreme Championship Wrestling.

Film
 Superstar: The Karen Carpenter Story, a 1987 short film using Barbie dolls to tell the story of pop singer Karen Carpenter
 Superstar (1999 film), a 1999 Saturday Night Live-based movie starring Molly Shannon as her popular character, Mary Katherine Gallagher
 Super Star (2002 film), a Kannada film
 Superstar (2008 Hindi film), a Bollywood film
 Superstar (2008 Sinhala film), a Sri Lankan film
 Superstar (2009 film), an Iranian film
 Superstar (2012 film), a French film
 Superstar (2015 film), a Nigerian film
 Superstar (2017 film), a Gujarati film
 Superstar (2019 film), a Pakistani film
 Superstar (2021 film), a Nollywood film

Television
 Superstar (Brazilian TV series), a Brazilian live reality television singing competition based on the Israeli series Rising Star
 Superstar (Philippine TV program), a Philippine musical variety show hosted by Nora Aunor
 Superstar (British TV series), a UK television talent search, looking for the lead role in the production Jesus Christ Superstar
 Super Star (Taiwanese TV series) (超級巨星紅白藝能大賞), a TTV annual music televised special series
 Superstar USA, an American reality television series
 "Superstar" (Buffy the Vampire Slayer), a 2000 episode of Buffy the Vampire Slayer
 "Superstar" (The Goodies), a 1973 episode of The Goodies
 Superstars (British TV programme), a sports competition television program that began in 1973
 Superstars (American TV program), the American version of the sports competition television program that aired on ABC, NBC and CBS
 The Superstars (2009 edition), a 2009 American revival of the sports competition television program
 WWE Superstars, a syndicated television show produced by the WWE
 WWF Superstars of Wrestling (later known as WWF Superstars), a syndicated television show produced by the World Wrestling Federation {now WWE}

Music talent shows based on Pop Idol
Deutschland sucht den Superstar, the German version
 SuperStar (Arabic TV series), the Arabic version
 SuperStar KZ, a reality television show in Kazakhstan
 SuperStar Search Slovakia, the Slovak version
 Česko hledá SuperStar, the Czech version
 SuperStar (Czech and Slovak TV series)

Music

Bands
 Superstar (band), a Scottish indie pop band led by Joe McAlinden

Albums
 Superstar (Len album), 1995
 Superstar (Wizkid album), 2011
 Superstar (Caroline Rose album), 2020
 Super Star (NaNa album), 1998
 Super Star (S.H.E album), 2003
 The Superstars, a 1982 album by Stars on 45
 Superstar (VTEN album), 2020

Songs
 "Superstar" (Christine Milton song), 2002, also covered by Jamelia
 "Superstar" (Delaney and Bonnie song), 1969, co-written by Leon Russell, notably recorded by the Carpenters and Luther Vandross
 "Superstar" (Ice Prince song), 2011
 "Superstar" (Jade MacRae song), 2005
 "Superstar" (Jesus Christ Superstar song), 1970
 "Superstar" (Lupe Fiasco song), 2007
 "Superstar" (Madonna song), 2012
 "Superstar" (Marina song), 2019
 "Superstar" (Pegboard Nerds and Nghtmre song), 2016
 "Superstar" (Toy-Box song), 2001
 "Superstar" (TVXQ song), 2011
 "Superstars" (song), by David Fonseca, 2007
 "Supastars", by Migos, 2018
 "Superstar", by Big Time Rush, from Elevate, 2011
 "Superstar", by Böhse Onkelz, from Adios, 2004
 "Superstar", by Geri Halliwell, from Passion, 2005
 "Superstar", by Gucci Mane, from Delusions of Grandeur, 2019
 "Superstar", by Ja Rule from Pain Is Love 2, 2012
 "Superstar", by Lisa from the album Juicy Music, 2003
 "Superstar", by RuPaul from Glamazon, 2011
 "Superstar", by Saliva from Every Six Seconds, 2001
 "Superstar", by Sycco, 2022
 "SuperStar", by Taylor Swift from Fearless, 2009
 "Superstar", by Underground Lovers from Dream It Down, 1994
 "Superstar", by Wiz Khalifa from Flight School, 2009
 "Süper Star" (Sibel Tüzün song), Turkey's 2006 Eurovision entry
 "Super Star", by Kwon Ji Yong
 "Super Star", by S.H.E. from Super Star
 "Superstar", by Keyshia Cole from The Way It Is, 2005

Video games
 Kirby Super Star, a 1996 video game
 WWF Superstars, 1989 arcade game
 WWF Superstars (handheld video game), 1991 game for Game Boy
 WWF Superstars 2, its sequel
 Super Star, an item that grants invincibility in the Super Mario franchise
 SuperStar SM Town, 2014 South Korean mobile rhythm game

Other uses
 Adidas Superstar, the name of a sneaker
 Superstars Series, a touring car championship based in Europe
 Guitar Superstar, a yearly guitar competition by Guitar Player magazine
 MS Superstar, a fast ropax ferry owned by Estonia-based Tallink
 Super Star (ride), a fairground ride manufactured by Super-rides International
 Superstars (novel), a 2000 novel by Ann Scott
 Superstar (ski course), a women's World Cup alpine ski piste in Killington, Vermont, US

See also
 Jesus Christ Superstar (disambiguation)